Afonso Poyart (born 1979) is a Brazilian film director, producer and writer. He made his feature film directorial debut with the 2012 action 2 Coelhos (Lit: 2 Rabbits) and later directed the film Solace, starring Anthony Hopkins.

Filmography

Film

Television

References

External links

1979 births
Living people
People from Santos, São Paulo
Brazilian film directors